Perry Township is one of the fifteen townships of Gallia County, Ohio, United States. As of the 2010 census the population was 1,595, up from 1,276 at the 2000 census.

Geography
Located in the western part of the county, it borders the following townships:
Raccoon Township - north
Springfield Township - northeast corner
Green Township - east
Harrison Township - southeast corner
Walnut Township - south
Greenfield Township - west
Madison Township, Jackson County - northwest

No municipalities are located in Perry Township, although the unincorporated community of Patriot is located in the township's southeast.

Name and history
It is one of twenty-six Perry Townships statewide.

Perry Township was established in 1816. In 1833, Perry Township contained three gristmills and three saw mills.

Government
The township is governed by a three-member board of trustees, who are elected in November of odd-numbered years to a four-year term beginning on the following January 1. Two are elected in the year after the presidential election and one is elected in the year before it. There is also an elected township fiscal officer, who serves a four-year term beginning on April 1 of the year after the election, which is held in November of the year before the presidential election. Vacancies in the fiscal officership or on the board of trustees are filled by the remaining trustees.

References

External links
County website

Townships in Gallia County, Ohio
Townships in Ohio